In this List of UNESCO Global Geoparks in Asia, the term "Asia" means the UNESCO regional network of "Asia Pacifica," which is not a distinction of continents. Anatolia, historically the first Greek "Asia," from Luwian aswiya, today is part of the European Geoparks Network, as is western Russia. As there are not yet any geoparks in Siberia, or eastern Russia, the question of what geopark region it is remains unsettled. Hence the "Asia" portion of Asia Pacifica means southern and central Asia from Iran to Japan with Southeast Asia, which merges into the undefined "Pacifica," presumably involving islands of the Pacific. They must include Australia and New Zealand, not generally considered Southeast Asian or part of Asia. Strictly speaking, distinctions of continent are not being embraced. 

All UNESCO regions, however, distinguish the regions by their nations, as part of the bottom up structure of UNESCO geopark networks. A geopark must first apply for accreditation in a "National Geopark Network," if it exists, or its equivalent if it does not. "National Geopark" is a label affixed by UNESCO to noteworthy parks or park systems within a nation. Once accredited there, the geopark applies (through its managers) to the Asia Pacific Geoparks Network (APGN). Only after its certification as a regional geopark can it apply for certification as a UNESCO Global Geopark, the international network, of which there is only one.

As of 2022, there are 65 geopark members in the APGN from 8 countries, of which 41 are situated in China.

Certified Global Geoparks in the APGN 
A certified global geopark is necessarily a certified regional geopark, here the APGN, and a certified national geopark. If any of the three levels of certification are missing for a park, it cannot be a global geopark and does not appear in the list.

See also
 National geoparks of China

References

External links 

 Asia Pacific Geoparks Network (accessed 10 February 2020)

Geoparks in Asia
Asia